Russell C. Redding is the Pennsylvania Secretary of Agriculture, having been nominated by Pennsylvania Governor Tom Wolf and confirmed in May 2015. He had previously served in that role in the administration of Governor Ed Rendell from 2009 until 2011. He also served as an agricultural policy adviser to U.S. Senator Harris Wofford. He was the dean of the School of Agriculture and Environmental Sciences at Delaware Valley University. He serves as Chair of the USDA Advisory Committee on Biotechnology and 21st Century Agriculture.

References

Living people
Pennsylvania State University alumni
State cabinet secretaries of Pennsylvania
Pennsylvania Democrats
Delaware Valley University faculty
Year of birth missing (living people)